Sanjay Mukund Kelkar is an Indian politician and member of the Bharatiya Janata Party. He is a second term member of the Maharashtra Legislative Assembly.

Constituency
Sanjay Mukund Kelkar is elected from the Thane-City Assembly Constituency Maharashtra.

Positions held 
Maharashtra Legislative Assembly MLA.
Terms in office: 2014–Present

References 

Bharatiya Janata Party politicians from Maharashtra
Members of the Maharashtra Legislative Assembly
Living people
Marathi politicians
1956 births